Polhillia is a genus of flowering plants in the family Fabaceae. It belongs to the subfamily Faboideae.

Species
Polhillia comprises the following species:
 Polhillia brevicalyx (C.H. Stirt.) B.-E. van Wyk & A.L. Schutte
 Polhillia canescens C.H. Stirt.
 Polhillia curtisiae C.H. Stirt. & Muasya
 Polhillia connatum (Harv.) C.H. Stirt.
 Polhillia ignota Boatwr.
 Polhillia involucratum (Thunb.) B.-E. van Wyk & A.L. Schutte
 Polhillia pallens C.H. Stirt.
 Polhillia waltersii (C.H. Stirt.) C.H. Stirt.

Species names with uncertain taxonomic status
The status of the following species is unresolved:
 Polhillia obsoleta (Harv.) B.-E.van Wyk

References

Genisteae
Fabaceae genera